Ishsam Shahruddin (born 31 August 1966) is a former Malaysian footballer.

Career
Ishsam played almost all his footballing career with Perak FA, save for one season with Negeri Sembilan FA. With Perak, Isham won the first ever Malaysia FA Cup in 1990.

After retiring from football, Ishsam has become a businessman/contractor, and also active in politics. Isham currently is back at Perak FA, this time as vice-president and also the team assistant manager. Isham was also responsible as manager of Perak FA President Cup (under-23) team.

National team
Ishsam has played for Malaysia in 1987.

References

External links
 Isham Shahruddin interview at Yob4Ever 

Malaysian footballers
Malaysia international footballers
Perak F.C. players
Negeri Sembilan FA players
Living people
1966 births
People from Perak
Malaysian people of Malay descent
Association football midfielders